Kaliyar  is a small village in the Idukki district of state Kerala in India .

Demographics
 the India census records Kaliyar had a population of 20000 with 13792 males and 13657 females.

References

Villages in Idukki district